Rödingsmarkt is an elevated metro station on the Hamburg U-Bahn line U3. It was opened in 1912 and is located in the borough of Hamburg-Mitte in Hamburg, Germany.

Service

Trains  
Rödingsmarkt is served by Hamburg U-Bahn line U3; departures are every 5 minutes.

See also 

 List of Hamburg U-Bahn stations

References

External links 

 Line and route network plans by hvv.de 
  Hamburg Untergrundbahn

Hamburg U-Bahn stations in Hamburg
U3 (Hamburg U-Bahn) stations
Buildings and structures in Hamburg-Mitte
Railway stations in Germany opened in 1912